Christoffer Rifalk (born July 6, 1996) is a Swedish professional ice hockey goaltender. He currently plays for Rögle BK of the Swedish Hockey League (SHL). During his first full season with IK Oskarshamn, Rifalk helped the club get promoted to the SHL.

References

External links
 

1996 births
IK Oskarshamn players
Living people
People from Kalix Municipality
Rögle BK players
Swedish ice hockey goaltenders
Sportspeople from Norrbotten County